Lancaster is an unincorporated community and census-designated place (CDP) in Lancaster County, Virginia, United States. It is the county seat, and is also known as Lancaster Courthouse or by an alternative spelling, Lancaster Court House. The community was first drawn as a CDP prior to the 2020 census.

Belle Isle and the Lancaster Court House Historic District are listed on the National Register of Historic Places.

References

Unincorporated communities in Lancaster County, Virginia
Unincorporated communities in Virginia
County seats in Virginia
Census-designated places in Lancaster County, Virginia
Census-designated places in Virginia